Filip Madžovski (born 1 January 1984 in Skopje, Macedonia) is a retired football (goalkeeper) who last played for FK Rabotnički.

International career
He made his senior debut for Macedonia in a June 2005 FIFA World Cup qualification match away against Armenia and has earned a total of 3 caps, scoring no goals. His final international was an August 2005 FIFA World Cup qualification match against Finland in Skopje.

References

External links

1984 births
Living people
Footballers from Skopje
Association football goalkeepers
Macedonian footballers
North Macedonia international footballers
FK Rabotnički players
FK Milano Kumanovo players
FK Vardar players
Long An FC players
Macedonian First Football League players
V.League 2 players
V.League 1 players
Macedonian expatriate footballers
Expatriate footballers in Vietnam